I’d be proud to be the Mother of a Soldier is a World War I song released in 1915. It was published by Shapiro, Bernstein & Co. in New York, New York.

This song, written and composed by Charles A. Bayha, uses what in later years became the classic image of the mother volunteering her son for military service.

The sheet music cover reads, "It would be a different story, if they trampled on old glory, I'd be proud to be the mother of a soldier."

The sheet music can be found at the Pritzker Military Museum and Library, as well as The University of Maine.

References 

Bibliography
 
Bayha, Charles A, and Takacs A. C. De. I'd Be Proud to Be the Mother of a Soldier. New York: Shapiro, Bernstein & Co, 1915. Musical score.
Gier, Christina. “War, Anxiety, and Hope in American Sheet Music, 1914–1917,”Music & Politics V. 7 Issue 1. Winter 2013. http://quod.lib.umich.edu/m/mp/9460447.0007.102/--war-anxiety-and-hope-in-american-sheet-music-19141917?rgn=main;view=fulltext
Parker, Bernard S. World War I Sheet Music 1. Jefferson: McFarland & Company, Inc., 2007. . 
Vogel, Frederick G. World War I Songs: A History and Dictionary of Popular American Patriotic Tunes, with Over 300 Complete Lyrics. Jefferson: McFarland & Company, Inc., 1995. .

External links 
 Sheet music and song MP3 at the Illinois Digital Archive

Songs about soldiers
Songs about the military
Songs about mothers
1915 songs
Songs of World War I